Nora El Koussour (born 1994) is a Dutch actress. She won the Golden Calf for Best Actress award in 2017 for her role in the film Layla M..

Career 

She made her film debut in the 2016 film Layla M.. She won the Golden Calf for Best Actress award in 2017 for her role in the film. The film was selected as the Dutch entry for the Best Foreign Language Film at the 90th Academy Awards, but it was not nominated.

In 2020, she appeared as Sanaa in the British crime thriller television series Baghdad Central. She also appeared in the Dutch television series Kerstgezel.nl.

In 2022, she appears as Emma Watson in the play Emma Watson - The Play.

Awards 

 2017: Golden Calf for Best Actress, Layla M.

Filmography 

 2016: Layla M.
 2017: Aziza
 2018: Mocro Maffia
 2019: The Promise of Pisa
2020: Kerstgezel.nl

References

External links 
 

1994 births
Living people
21st-century Dutch actresses
Dutch film actresses
Dutch television actresses
Golden Calf winners
People from Veghel
Dutch people of Moroccan descent